Tabebuia rosea, also called pink poui, and rosy trumpet tree is a neotropical tree that grows up to  and can reach a diameter at breast height of up to . The Spanish name roble de sabana, meaning "savannah oak", is widely used in Costa Rica, probably because it often remains in heavily deforested areas and because of the resemblance of its wood to that of oak trees. It is the national tree of El Salvador, where it is called "Maquilíshuat".

Names
The tree is known as "tekoma" in Malaysia.

The tree is known as "රොබරෝසියා (Robarōsiyā)" in Sri Lanka.

Distribution and habitat
This species is distributed from southern México, to Venezuela and Ecuador.

This tree is often seen in Neotropical cities, where it is often planted in parks and gardens. In the rainy season it offers shade and, in the dry season, abundant flowers are present on the defoliated trees.

Description
The tree is short length, with irregular, stratified ramification and only few thick branches. The bark can be gray to brown, in varying darkness and may be vertically fissured. Leaves are compound, digitate and deciduous. Each leaf has five leaflets of variable size, the middle one being the largest. Flowering occurs mainly in January and February, and is generally associated with dry periods; although flowering has also been observed in August, September, April and May. Flowers are large, in various tones of pink to purple, and appear while the tree has none, or very few, leaves. Pollination occurs probably by insects, although the flowers are visited by many birds such as tanagers, hummingbirds and orioles. After the drying fruit dehisces, the anemochorous, hyaline-membrane-winged seeds are released. There are an average of 45,000 seeds per kg with up to 13% water content. Germination of seeds is extremely easy and efficient, reaching almost 100%. It is a fairly fast growing tree.

Medicinal uses
Preparations of the bark of the tree are consumed to eliminate intestinal parasites, malaria and uterine cancer. A decoction of the bark is recommended for anemia and constipation. A decoction of the flowers, leaves and roots has been used to reduce fevers and pain, cause sweating, to treat tonsil inflammation and various other disorders.

Among the various active phytochemicals in the tree is lapachol, a natural organic compound isolated from various other Tabebuia species. Chemically, it is a derivative of naphthoquinone, related to vitamin K.

Once studied as a possible treatment for some types of cancer, lapachol's potential is now considered low due to its toxic side effects. Lapachol also has antimalarial and antitrypanosomal effects.

References

External links
 INBio−Atta: Tabebuia rosea
 RNGR.net: Tropical Tree Seed Manual − Tabebuia rosea

rosea
Trees of Mexico
Trees of Belize
Trees of Costa Rica
Trees of El Salvador
Trees of Guatemala
Trees of Honduras
Trees of Nicaragua
Trees of Panama
Trees of Venezuela
Trees of Colombia
Trees of Ecuador
Garden plants of North America
Garden plants of South America
Least concern plants
Least concern flora of North America
Least concern biota of Mexico
Least concern biota of South America
National symbols of El Salvador
Taxa named by Augustin Pyramus de Candolle